Marcel Bernard (18 May 1914 – 29 April 1994) was a French tennis player. He is best remembered for having won the French Championships in 1946 (reaching the semifinals a further three times). Bernard initially intended to play only in the doubles event but was persuaded to enter the singles competition as well. He defeated Jaroslav Drobný in the final in five sets.

In the same 1946 French Championships Bernard also won the Men's Doubles with Yvon Petra.  In the 1935 French Open, he won the Mixed Doubles with Lolette Payot.  In the following French Open (1936), he also won the Mixed Doubles with Billie Yorke and the Men's Doubles with Jean Borotra. Bernard's Grand Slam singles career spanned 25 years from 1931 to 1956. He played Davis Cup for France over a period spanning 21 years, from 1935 to 1956. Bernard was ranked world No. 5 for 1946 by A. Wallis Myers and world No. 9 for 1947 by Harry Hopman.

Bernard became president of the national French tennis association, Fédération Française de Tennis (FFT), in 1968 and held the position until 1973. The trophy for the winners of the mixed doubles competition at the French Open is now known as the "Coupe Marcel Bernard". His name is also commemorated at the Roland-Garros Stadium by the walkway "Allée Marcel Bernard" which leads to the Suzanne Lenglen Court.

Grand Slam finals

Singles : 1 title

Doubles : 2 titles, 1 runner-up

Mixed doubles : 2 titles

References

External links
 
 
 

1914 births
1994 deaths
French Championships (tennis) champions
French male tennis players
People from La Madeleine, Nord
Grand Slam (tennis) champions in men's singles
Grand Slam (tennis) champions in mixed doubles
Grand Slam (tennis) champions in men's doubles
Sportspeople from Nord (French department)
Presidents of the French Tennis Federation